Tony Chi is an American interior designer. He is the co-founder of New York-based design firm tonychi studio together with Tammy Chou.

Early life and education
Chi was born in Taipei, Taiwan, the youngest of five children. He later moved to New York's Lower East Side at the age of six. He attended the High School of Art and Design and studied interior design at the Fashion Institute of Technology (FIT).

Career
After graduating from FIT in 1984, Chi and his wife opened a Hunan-Sichuan restaurant, which later closed in 1996.

Chi got his start designing restaurants for Charles Morris Mount Design, and left to found his namesake studio in 1984 with wife Tammy Chou.

Following the stock market crash of 1987, Chi traveled abroad to create food and beverage concepts throughout Asia from Hong Kong to Jakarta. In Hong Kong, he met the real estate developer Allan Zeman and restaurateur Paul Hsu, and the trio started transforming the island's Lan Kwai Fong district into an entertainment destination, which was the start of his international career in design.

Chi later designed restaurants for chefs like Wolfgang Puck, Alain Ducasse and Michael Mina. Later, Chi began to expand his portfolio to include hotel interiors, from Santiago to Geneva, developing his signature "invisible design" aesthetic, or that which you do not necessarily see, but feel and perceive.

In 2019, Chi's daughter Alison Chi took lead as the head of creative development at his studio, with long-time associate Bill Paley as creative director and lead designer.

Notable projects
The studio has designed Park Hyatt properties in Shanghai, Washington D.C. and Moscow, as well as  Rosewood London in High Holborn, W Santiago, Mandarin Oriental Guangzhou, and restaurants in Taipei amongst other hospitality projects.

Other projects in Tony Chi's portfolio include:

 Andaz 5th Avenue New York (2010)
 Grand Hyatt Chengdu (2011)
 Grand Hyatt Berlin (2013)
 InterContinental Geneva (2013)
 Andaz Tokyo Toranomon Hills (2014)
 Park Hyatt Kyoto (2019)
 Rosewood Hong Kong (2019)
 Grand Hyatt Erawan Bangkok (2020)
 Andaz Shenzhen Bay (2021)
 The Carlyle (2021)

Awards

Chi was inducted into Interior Design's Hall of Fame in 2009 and awarded FIT's Lawrence Israel Prize in 2015.

References 

American interior designers
Fashion Institute of Technology alumni
People from the Lower East Side
High School of Art and Design alumni
Artists from Taipei
Taiwanese emigrants to the United States
Living people
Year of birth missing (living people)